Angostura Municipality may refer to:
 Angostura Municipality, Sinaloa, Mexico
 Angostura Municipality, Venezuela

municipality name disambiguation pages